Huntingdonshire County Cricket Club is one of the county clubs which make up the minor counties in the English domestic cricket structure, representing the historic county of Huntingdonshire. The club does not currently compete in either the Minor Counties Championship or MCCA Knockout Trophy, but does play informal matches, typically against armed forces teams and county academies.

Earliest cricket
Cricket probably reached Huntingdonshire in the 17th century. The earliest reference to the game in the general region is in neighbouring Cambridgeshire at the University of Cambridge in 1710. In 1741, John Montagu, 4th Earl of Sandwich became patron and captain of a Huntingdonshire county team which, as part of a united Northamptonshire & Huntingdonshire team, twice defeated Bedfordshire in important matches.

Origin of the club
Huntingdonshire County Cricket Club was first formed in 1831 and existed until 1895. Initially, until the early 1850s, matches were played against club sides but from the start of the 1850s the club found regular County opponents.

Up until 1874 Huntingdonshire played home matches at Millers Holme, Godmanchester. From 1874 the club played at the Huntingdon Cricket Club Ground and continues to do so to this day.  In 1895 the club was disbanded. In the 1920s the club was briefly reformed before folding once again. The current county club was formed in 1948.

From 1999 to 2003, the county entered teams into the English domestic one-day competition, matches which had List A status.  The county played seven List A matches during this period, with the final List A match it played coming against Cheshire. During this period, the club used The Parks, Godmanchester as its home ground.

Players
See List of Huntingdonshire County Cricket Club List A players and :Category:Huntingdonshire cricketers

Grounds
Below is a complete list of grounds used by Huntingdonshire County Cricket Club when it was permitted to play List A and MCCA Knockout Trophy matches. These grounds have also held List A and MCCA Knockout Trophy matches.

Notes

References

Bibliography

External links
 Huntingdonshire Cricket

 
National Counties cricket
Cricket clubs established in 1831
Cricket clubs established in 1948
Cricket in Huntingdonshire
Cricket in Cambridgeshire
1831 establishments in England
1948 establishments in England